The following is a list of notable deaths in February 1994.

Entries for each day are listed alphabetically by surname. A typical entry lists information in the following sequence:
 Name, age, country of citizenship at birth, subsequent country of citizenship (if applicable), reason for notability, cause of death (if known), and reference.

February 1994

1
Sergei Dubov, 50, Russian journalist, publisher and entrepreneur, homicide.
Ray Ferris, 73, Northern Irish football player.
Guy Lefranc, 74, French director and screenwriter.
John Littlejohn, 62, American electric blues guitarist, kidney failure.
Jo Richardson, 70, British Labour Party politician.
Radovan Samardžić, 71, Yugoslav/Serbian historian and academic.
Olan Soule, 84, American actor, lung cancer.

2
Steve Barclay, 75, American film actor.
Jean Couturier, 82, French basketball player.
Marija Gimbutas, 73, Lithuanian archaeologist and anthropologist.
Zaim Imamović, 73, Bosnian folk singer, accordionist and author.
Otto Kippes, 88, German Catholic priest.
Yōichi Nakanishi, 76, Japanese politician and Governor of Ishikawa Prefecture.
John Rewald, 81, American academic, author and art historian.
Willie Mae Ford Smith, 89, American gospel musician and Christian evangelist.
Mary Washburn, 86, American sprinter.
Anona Winn, 90, Australian-British actress, broadcaster and singer.

3
Anatoly Petrovich Alexandrov, 90, Soviet and Russian physicist and academic.
Roberto Amoroso, 83, Italian screenwriter and film producer.
Rauf Atakishiyev, 68, Soviet and Azerbaijani singer and pianist.
Carroll Borland, 79, American professor, writer, and actress, pneumonia.
Herbert Busemann, 88, German-American mathematician.
Frederick Copleston, 86, English Roman Catholic Jesuit priest, philosopher, and historian.
Justinus Darmojuwono, 79, Indonesian Roman Catholic cardinal.
Walter Havighurst, 92, American novelist, critic, and literary and social historian.
Alan Helffrich, 93, American athlete and Olympic champion.
Ellen King, 85, Scottish swimmer and Olympian.
Patrick El Mabrouk, 65, French middle-distance runner and Olympian.
Raúl Padilla, 75, Mexican actor, heart attack.
Glenn Wade Salisbury, 83, American agriculture biologist.
Georgy Shchedrovitsky, 64, Soviet and Russian philosopher and methodologist.
Dale Warren, 54, American musician.

4
Jane Arbor, 90, British writer.
Fred De Bruyne, 63, Belgian road cyclist.
Brunetto Bucciarelli Ducci, 79, Italian politician and magistrate.
Bedri Gürsoy, 92, Turkish football player.
Mikhail Linge, 35, Soviet and Russian middle-distance runner and Olympic champion, murdered.
Thelma Stovall, 74, American politician.

5
Hermann Josef Abs, 92, German banker and advisor to Chancellor Konrad Adenauer.
Ben Enwonwu, 72, Nigerian painter and sculptor.
Joachim Halupczok, 25, Polish racing cyclist, heart failure.
Tiana Lemnitz, 96, German operatic soprano.
George Sauer, 83, American football player, coach, and football executive.
James F. Walker, 80, American graphic artist.

6
Joseph Cotten, 88, American actor (Citizen Kane, Shadow of a Doubt, The Third Man), pneumonia.
Norman Del Mar, 74, British conductor, horn player, and biographer.
Felice Gremo, 92, Italian racing cyclist.
Ross Grimsley, 71, American Major League Baseball player.
Jack Kirby, 76, American comic book artist and writer (Fantastic Four, Captain America, X-Men), heart failure.
Aurora Mardiganian, 93, Armenian-American author and actress.
Hilda Simms, 75, American stage actress, pancreatic cancer.
Ignace Strasfogel, 84, Polish pianist, composer and conductor, Alzheimer's disease.
Luis Alberto Sánchez, 93, Peruvian jurist, philosopher, writer and politician.
Gwen Watford, 66, English actress, cancer.

7
Richard M. Bissell, Jr., 84, American CIA officer.
Billy Briscoe, 97, English football player.
Laurence Brown, 86, English Anglican clergyman.
Jorge Brum do Canto, 83, Portuguese film director and actor.
Witold Lutosławski, 81, Polish composer and conductor.
Bill McDonald, 77, American basketball player.
Stephen Milligan, 45, British politician and journalist, erotic asphyxiation.
Charles Leslie Richardson, 85, British Army officer.
Arnold Smith, 79, Canadian diplomat.
Maarten Vrolijk, 74, Dutch socialist politician.

8
Ken G. Hall, 92, Australian film producer and director.
Amparo Ochoa, 47, Mexican singer-songwriter.
Bob Reynolds, 79, American gridiron football player.
Raymond Scott, 85, American musician, record producer, and inventor of electronic instruments.

9
Raymond A. Hare, 92, American diplomat and ambassador.
Louis Kaufman, 88, American violinist.
Gherasim Luca, 80, Romanian surrealist theorist and poet, suicide.
Jarmila Novotná, 86, Czechoslovak and Chech soprano and actress.
Howard Temin, 59, American geneticist and virologist, lung cancer.
Bud Wilkinson, 77, American football player, coach, broadcaster, and politician.

10
Mel Calman, 62, British cartoonist, thrombosis.
Robert Crépeaux, 93, French chess master.
Fritz John, 83, German-American mathematician.
Dominic McGlinchey, 39–40, Irish republican paramilitary leader, shot.
Augusts Voss, 77, Soviet and Latvian politician.

11
Neil Bonnett, 47, American racing driver, racing accident.
Sorrell Booke, 64, American actor (The Dukes of Hazzard, Fail-Safe, Freaky Friday), colorectal cancer.
William Conrad, 73, American actor (Jake and the Fatman, Cannon, The Killers), heart failure.
Joseph Cordeiro, 76, Pakistani Catholic priest.
Paul Feyerabend, 70, Austrian philosopher of science, brain cancer.
Mercè Comaposada i Guillén, 92, Spanish pedagogue, lawyer, and anarcha-feminist.
Sune Mangs, 61, Swedish actor.
Antonio Martín, 23, Spanish road bicycle racer, bicycle accident.
Saul Weprin, 66, American attorney and politician, stroke.
Vincent Wigglesworth, 94, British entomologist.

12
Charles Critchfield, 83, American mathematical physicist.
Ray Dandridge, 80, American Negro league baseball player.
Ivor Darreg, 76, American composer of xenharmonic music.
Rafael Durán, 82, Spanish actor.
Rahela Ferari, 82, Yugoslavian and Serbian actress.
Donald Judd, 65, American minimalist artist, lymphoma.
Richard Luyt, 78, South African Governor of British Guiana.
Sue Rodriguez, 43, Canadian right-to-die activist, ALS.
Karl Wirtz, 83, German nuclear physicist.

13
Michael Lindsay, 2nd Baron Lindsay of Birker, 84, British peer and academic.
Robert Bloom, 85, American oboist, composer and arranger.
Walter Judd, 95, American politician and physician.
Mostafa Salimi, 90, Iranian football player and manager.
Robert Sherrod, 85, American journalist, editor and writer, pulmonary emphysema.

14
Pietro Belluschi, 94, Italian-American architect.
Andrei Chikatilo, 57, Soviet serial killer, execution by shooting.
Ivan Chodák, 80, Slovak football player and coach.
Jean Goldschmit, 69, Luxembourgian road bicycle racer.
Tiger Haynes, 79, American actor and film and jazz musician.
Margaret Lane, 87, British journalist, biographer and novelist.
Christopher Lasch, 61, American historian, moralist and social critic, leukemia.
Henry Milton Taylor, 90, Governor-general of the Bahamas.

15
Richard Emory, 75, American actor, stroke.
Frank Kitto, 90, Australian lawyer and judge.
Liu Ningyi, 86, Chinese politician.
Andrea Heinemann Simon, 84, American civil rights activist and mother of singer Carly Simon, lung cancer.

16
Noël Foré, 61, Belgian road bicycle racer.
François Marty, 89, French Catholic Cardinal and Archbishop of Paris, railway accident.
Richard O'Kane, 83, American Navy submarine commander during World War II.
Bob C. Riley, 69, American educator and politician.
Ann Wigmore, 84, Lithuanian-American holistic health practitioner and naturopath.

17
Neville Broderick, 66, Australian rules football player.
Aleksandr Chakovsky, 80, Soviet/Russian editor and novelist.
Gretchen Fraser, 75, American alpine ski racer and Olympian.
Rosario García Ortega, 82, Argentine actress.
Chimanbhai Patel, 64, Indian politician.
Randy Shilts, 42, American journalist and author, AIDS-related complications.
Vilmos Varjú, 56, Hungarian shot putter and Olympian.

18
Annemarie Ackermann, 80, German politician and member of the Bundestag.
Ruth Adler, 49, British feminist and human rights campaigner.
Michel Duran, 93, French actor, author, and screenwriter.
Jake Gaither, 90, American gridiron football coach.
Gopi Krishna, 58, Indian dancer, actor and choreographer, heart attack.
Beltrán Alfonso Osorio, 75, Spanish peer and jockey.
Robert H. Park, 91, American electrical engineer and inventor.
Ameer Hamza Shinwari, 87, Afghanistan Pashto-language poet.
John Tedder, 2nd Baron Tedder, 67, British noble and chemist.
Ralph W. Tyler, 91, American educator.
Barbara Willard, 84, British novelist.

19
Johnny Hancocks, 74, English football player and manager.
Derek Jarman, 52, English film director, author and gay rights activist, AIDS-related complications.
Patrick O'Reilly, 66, Irish politician.
Fyodor Odinokov, 81, Soviet and Russian actor.
Vittorio Rieti, 96, Italian-American composer.
Ivan Sidorenko, 74, Soviet sniper during World War II and Hero of the Soviet Union.
Yitzhak Yitzhaky, 57, Israeli educator and politician.

20
Vladimir Druzhnikov, 71, Soviet actor.
Marino Girolami, 80, Italian film director and actor.
Rolf Jacobsen, 86, Norwegian author.
Víctor Parra, 74, Mexican actor and producer.

21
Gerda Alexander, 86, German-Danish teacher and psychologist.
Evgeny Belyaev, 67, Russian tenor.
Oscar Collazo, 80, Puerto Rican militant.
Homa Darabi, 54, Iranian pediatrician, academic and political activist, suicide.
Mary Lasker, 93, American health activist and philanthropist.
Johannes Steinhoff, 80, German Luftwaffe fighter ace during World War II, and NATO official.

22
Papa John Creach, 76, American blues violinist.
Hans Hürlimann, 75, Swiss politician.
Lore Lorentz, 73, German kabarett artist and standup comedian, pneumonia.
János Pap, 68, Hungarian communist politician, suicide.
T. Chalapathi Rao, 73, Indian film music director.
Barry Warren, 60, British actor.
Dan Zakhem, 35, Israeli performance artist, AIDS-related brain cancer.

23
Marvin Burke, 75, American NASCAR racecar driver.
Odd Højdahl, 73, Norwegian politician.
Arthur Piantadosi, 77, American sound engineer (All the President's Men, Tootsie, Altered States), Oscar winner (1977).
Jackie Power, 77, Irish hurler and gaelic football player.
Manfredo Tafuri, 58, Italian architect, historian, critic and academic, heart attack.

24
Alighiero Boetti, 53, Italian conceptual artist.
Maude Bonney, 96, South African-Australian aviator.
Ulrich Gabler, 80, German U-boat chief engineer during World War II .
Robert Gronowski, 67, Polish football player and manager.
Ion Lăpușneanu, 85, Romanian football goalkeeper.
Ladislav Mňačko, 75, Slovak writer and journalist.
Jean Sablon, 87, French singer, songwriter, composer and actor.
Dinah Shore, 77, American singer, actress, and television personality, ovarian cancer.
Hugh Tayfield, 65, South African cricket player.

25
Marvin J. Ashton, 78, American politician, writer, and apostle of the LDS Church.
Russell Bufalino, 90, Italian-American mobster, heart attack.
Givi Chokheli, 56, Georgian football player.
Baruch Goldstein, 37, American-Israeli mass murderer and religious extremist, beaten to death.
Hamoud bin Abdulaziz Al Saud, 47, Saudi royal and businessman.
Jersey Joe Walcott, 80, American boxer.

26
Tarık Buğra, 75, Turkish journalist, novelist and short story author.
J. L. Carr, 81, English novelist, publisher, and eccentric.
Sofka Dolgorouky, 86, Russian-British princess, writer and communist.
Avery Fisher, 87, Amateur violinist and philanthropist.
Bill Hicks, 32, American stand-up comedian, satirist, and musician, pancreatic cancer.
Leopold Kohr, 84, Austrian-American economist, jurist and political scientist.
Jack Oatey, 73, Australian rules football player and coach.

27
Harold Acton, 89, British writer, scholar, and aesthete.
Layton Fergusson, 85, Canadian politician.
Arnold Townsend, 81, English cricket player.
Tor Ørvig, 77, Norwegian-Swedish paleontologist.

28
Olivier Alain, 75, French organist, pianist, musicologist and composer.
Harvey Leibenstein, 71, Ukrainian-American economist.
Pujie, 86, Chinese Qing dynasty imperial prince.
Enrico Maria Salerno, 67, Italian actor, voice actor and film director, lung cancer.
Jimmy Stevens, 74, Ni-Vanuatu nationalist and politician, stomach cancer.
Jürgen von Alten, 91, German actor, screenwriter and film director.
Skippy Williams, 77, American jazz tenor saxophonist and musical arranger.

References 

1994-02
 02